Adrian Constantin Solomon (born 28 April 1974) is a Romanian former football midfielder who spent his entire career at Ceahlăul Piatra Neamț.

References

External links
 

1974 births
Living people
Romanian footballers
Association football midfielders
Liga I players
Liga II players
CSM Ceahlăul Piatra Neamț players
Sportspeople from Piatra Neamț